Figueiras e Covas is a civil parish in the municipality of Lousada, Portugal. It was formed in 2013 by the merger of the former parishes Figueiras and Covas. The population in 2011 was 2,108, in an area of 4.34 km².

References

Freguesias of Lousada